Richard Granville Hare, 4th Earl of Listowel (12 September 1866 – 16 November 1931), known as Viscount Ennismore from 1866 to 1924, was an Irish peer and British Army officer.

Lord Ennismore was the eldest son of William Hare, 3rd Earl of Listowel and Lady Ernestine Brudenell-Bruce, daughter of the Marquess of Ailesbury. He was educated at Eton and at Christ Church, Oxford. Commissioned as a lieutenant into the Grenadier Guards in 1890, he later transferred to the 4th (Militia) Battalion of the Royal Munster Fusiliers.

Following the outbreak of the Second Boer War in late 1899, Lord Ennismore was seconded for active service with the Imperial Yeomanry, and on 3 February 1900 appointed a lieutenant of the 45th (Dublin) Company, attached to the 13th Battalion, Imperial Yeomanry. The company left for South Africa in the middle of March 1900.

He was then subsequently on the Western Front for the Great War, where he was promoted to Major as a volunteer for the County of London regiment, before being transferred back to the Royal Munster Fusiliers. It was not until 5 June 1924 that he came into his inheritance as Viscount and Earl of Listowel, and Baron Hare of Convamore, as well as Baron Ennismore.

Personal life

He married Hon Freda Vanden-Bempde-Johnstone, daughter of Francis Vanden-Bempde-Johnstone, 2nd Baron Derwent, by Ethel Strickland-Constable, and they had six children:

 William Francis Hare, 5th Earl of Listowel (born 28 September 1906, died 12 March 1997)
 Hon Gilbert Richard Hare (born 5 September 1907, died 14 September 1966)
 John Hugh Hare, 1st Viscount Blakenham (born 22 January 1911, died 7 March 1982)
 Lady Ethel Patricia Hare (born 29 October 1912, died 24 October 2005)
 Lady Elizabeth Cecilia Hare (born 8 May 1914, died 1990)- Arthur Guinness, Viscount Elveden (son and heir to Rupert Guinness, 2nd Earl of Iveagh) until his death in 1945. Married Edward More O'Ferrall in 1947.
 Major Hon Alan Victor Hare (born 14 March 1919, died 10 April 1995)

References

1866 births
1931 deaths
People educated at Eton College
Alumni of Christ Church, Oxford
Grenadier Guards officers
4
Richard